Zhao Gang, may refer to:

Zhao Gang (fencer), Chinese fencer

Zhao Gang (born 1968), Chinese politician

Zhao Gang (born 1964), Chinese politician

Zhao Gang (lieutenant general), Chinese People's Liberation Army general